Jösse can mean:

Jösse Hundred, district of Värmland in Sweden
Jösse Car, sports car manufacturer founded in 1997 and located in Arvika, Sweden